This is the list of chemical engineering societies in the world. They are sorted by continent and alphabetically. They include national or international ones, but not student societies or those otherwise restricted to a particular university or institution.

Africa
 Ethiopian Society of Chemical Engineers (ESChE), Ethiopia
 Nigerian Society of Chemical Engineers
 South African Institution of Chemical Engineers (SAIChE), South Africa

Asia
 Asia Pacific Confederation of Chemical Engineering (APCChE)
 Iranian Association of Chemical Engineering (IAChE) , I.R. Iran
 Indian Institute of Chemical Engineers (IIChe), India 
 Israel Institute of Chemical Engineers (IIChe), Israel 
 Korean Chemical Society (KCS), Korea 
 Korean Institute of Chemical Engineers (KIChE), Korea 
 Pakistan Institute of Chemical Engineers (PICHE), Pakistan 
 Philippine Institute of Chemical Engineers (PIChE), Philippines 
 Society of Chemical Engineers, Japan (SCEJ), Japan 
 Society of Chemical Engineers of Nepal, Kathmandu, Nepal 
 Taiwan Institute of Chemical Engineering (TwIChE), Taiwan 
 Thai Institute of Chemical Engineering and Applied Chemistry (TIChE), Thailand

Europe
 European Federation of Chemical Engineering (EFCE) (umbrella organization)
 Associazione Italiana Di Ingegneria Chimica (AIDIC), Italy
 Chamber of Chemical Engineers, Turkey 
 DECHEMA, Germany
 Institution of Chemical Engineers (IChemE), UK
 Soci�t� Fran�aise de G�nie des Proc�d�s (SFGP), France

North America
 American Chemical Society (ACS)
 American Institute of Chemical Engineers (AIChE)
 Association of Energy Engineers (AEE)
 Canadian Society for Chemical Engineering (CSChE)
 National Organization for the Professional Advancement of Black Chemists and Chemical Engineers (NOBCChE)
 Mexican Institute of Chemical Engineers (IMIQ), Mexico

Oceania
 The Australian and New Zealand Federation of Chemical Engineers (ANZFChE)
 Engineers Australia Chemical College, Australia
 Society of Chemical Engineers New Zealand

South America
 Argentinian Association for Chemical Engineers, Argentina
 Brazilian Association of Chemical Engineering, Brazil
 Colombian Association of Chemical Engineering, Colombia
 Association of Chemical Engineers of Uruguay, Uruguay

References

Chemical engineering organizations
 Chemical engineering
Societies, chemical engineering
Chemical
Chemical engineering